Sinton Independent School District is a public school district based in Sinton, Texas (USA).

Sinton is located in San Patricio county. Many churches, representing various denominations, thrive in Sinton. The citizens have access to a hospital close at hand. Texas A&M University-Corpus Christi provides higher education opportunities.

Sinton ISD has an enrollment of 2,100+ students in its 200+ square mile area. Students attend classes on one of four campuses, including Sinton High School, E. Merle Smith Middle School, Sinton Elementary, and Welder Elementary. 78.7% of the student body is Hispanic, 19.8% is White, with the remaining 1.5% Black, Asian, and Native American students.

Academically, Sinton ISD has performed well and is a state of Texas "Recognized" district.  The elementary grades employ a variety of teaching strategies and curricula, including  Balanced Literacy, Accelerated Reader, and Reading Renaissance. The Talent Pool enriches potentially gifted students in all content areas.

In 2009 & 2010, the school district was rated "Recognized" by the Texas Education Agency.

In addition to Sinton, the district also serves the communities of St. Paul, Rancho Chico, Del Sol-Loma Linda, and Morgan Farm Area.

Schools
Sinton High School (Grades 9-12)
E. Merle Smith Middle School (Grades 6-8)
Sinton Elementary (Grades 3-5)
Welder Elementary (Grades PK-2)
Dave Odem Learning Center

References

External links
 

School districts in San Patricio County, Texas